The 2018–19 Gibraltar Second Division Cup was the twelfth edition of the second division cup tournament on Gibraltar, and second under its current title. After a year without the tournament due to renovations to the only stadium on the territory, Victoria Stadium, the tournament returned in January 2019 during the 2018–19 Gibraltar Second Division's mid-season break.

Gibraltar Phoenix are the reigning champions, having won the last title in 2017, however they are unable to defend their title as they were promoted to the Gibraltar Premier Division at the end of the 2016–17 Gibraltar Second Division season.

The draw for the group stage was made along with first round draws for the 2019 Rock Cup and 2018–19 Gibraltar Intermediate Cup on 29 November 2018. Bruno's Magpies won the cup on 3 March 2019, defeating Olympique 13 2–1 in the final.

Group stage

Group A

Group B

Semi-finals
The semi-finals were played on the 24 February.

Final

Top Scorers
.

15 goals
 Alejandro Carenote (Olympique 13)
6 goals

 Finnlay Wyatt (Bruno's Magpies)
 Chris Mousdell (Leo)

5 goals

 Matheus Assumpção (Bruno's Magpies)
 Christian Núñez (Europa Point)
 Riki Rojo (Olympique 13)
 Pedro Ruiz (Olympique 13)

4 goals
 Godwin Egbo (Olympique 13)
3 goals

 Fernando Cuesta (Bruno's Magpies)
 Matthew Langtry (Manchester 62)

2 goals

 Alex Dimitriu (Bruno's Magpies)
 Matthew Grech (Bruno's Magpies)
 Thomas Parry (Bruno's Magpies)
 Jonathan Field (College 1975)
 Julian Lopez (Europa Point)
 Alexis Sánchez (Europa Point)
 Ekrem Yavuz (Leo)
 Samuel Fernández (Manchester 62)
 Robert Montovio (Manchester 62)
 Jaydan Parody (Olympique 13)
 Dizza Usman (Olympique 13)

1 goal

 Chase Covello (Bruno's Magpies)
 Ross Gray (Bruno's Magpies)
 Carl Thomas (Bruno's Magpies)
 Francisco Marin (College 1975)
 Rubén Palmero (College 1975)
 Ayman Boulaich (Europa Point)
 Haitam Fakir Sellam (Europa Point)
 Christian Gonzalez (Europa Point)
 Jesse Moonilall (Hound Dogs)
 Kaylan Muscat (Leo)
 James Watson (Leo)
 Javier Caro (Manchester 62)
 Lython Marquez (Manchester 62)
 Jamie-Luke McCarthy (Manchester 62)
 Christian Toncheff (Manchester 62)
 Nick Castle (Olympique 13)
 Jonatan García Navas (Olympique 13)
 Adrian Lopez (Olympique 13)
 Andrew Lopez (Olympique 13)
 Uche Nwankwo (Olympique 13)
 Karl Sene (Olympique 13)

References

2018–19 in Gibraltar football
Football competitions in Gibraltar